Football is the most popular sport in Mauritius. The national governing body is the Mauritius Football Association. Internationally, Mauritius is represented by Club M in senior competitions, and by the U-17 and U-20 teams in youth competitions. The top domestic football league in Mauritius is the Mauritian League, and the top knockout tournament is the Mauritian Cup.

History
Football in Mauritius has had a tumultuous history. The Mauritian League was founded in 1935, and the Mauritius Football Association (MFA) was founded in 1952, affiliated to FIFA in 1962 and to the Confederation of African Football (CAF) in 1963. The founding members of the association were FC Dodo, Faucon Flacq SC (now renamed Flacq SC), CSC, Hounds, Royal College of Curepipe, and Saint Joseph College, all of which were based out of Curepipe and, with the exception of Flacq SC, have since ceased to exist. Troubles have arisen for the MFA, ranging from perpetual financial shortages to constant changes of presidents, and it has been under fire from various quarters for failing to stem the decline of football in Mauritius. Although football continues to be the most popular sport in the country, the majority of domestic league matches attract very few spectators (sometimes less than a handful), earning the clubs and the MFA very little income and leaving the players without the motivation to showcase their skills.

The focus of the sport's popularity has almost completely shifted to the English Premier League, which is considered far more exciting due to the high quality of football on display and the presence of numerous world-famous stars. National and International television networks beam Premier League matches into the living rooms multiple times every week, adding to the erosion of interest in local football.

There are a lot of Liverpool and Manchester United fans in Mauritius.

The 1999 major restructuring of the MPL was regarded as the beginning of the decline in Mauritian football. Due to a riot on May 23, 1999, between Fire Brigade Sports Club (now renamed as Pamplemousses SC) and Scouts Club (renamed as Port Louis Sporting Club), which lasted for three days and killed seven people, the government imposed an 18-month ban on all footballing activities in the country, with only the national team permitted to play during this period. The restructure, which was an effort to de-ethnicize local clubs, required the "regionalization" of clubs, with teams now being formed on the basis of region instead of ethnicity or religion. Although the move achieved the desired results in terms of reduction in violent conflicts, it also removed the traditional rivalry among fans, resulting in loss of interest and support. In fact, many locals believe that the resurrection of Mauritian football lies in permitting the formation of clubs on the basis of ethnicity or religion.

On the international stage, the national team, known as Club M, has not had much success, only winning the Indian Ocean Games twice and qualifying for the Africa Cup of Nations once in 1974. It has plummeted down the FIFA World Rankings in the past few years to the lowest it has ever been. The future looks bright though, as in 2006 four Regional Technical Centers (CTRs) were created to improve youth football in Mauritius, with hopes of revitalizing the national team. There is hope that Mauritian football can grow to new heights if the MPL continues to grow and new talent is found in the CTRs.

Mauritius national football team
 

The Mauritius national football team is the national football team of Mauritius. Club M won the Indian Ocean Island Games in 2003.

Mauritian League
 

The Mauritian League, otherwise known as the Barclays League, is the top league of Mauritian football. The MFA Second Division is the second highest level of Mauritian football.

Mauritian Cup
 

The Mauritian Cup is the top knockout tournament of Mauritian football.

League system

Notable Mauritian footballers

Born in Mauritius

Of Mauritian heritage

References